Telega is a type of four-wheel horse-drawn vehicle, whose primary purpose is to carry loads, similar to a wain, known in Russia and other countries. It has been defined as "a special type commonly used in the southern and south-western provinces for the carriage of grain, hay and other agricultural products".

It is described and spelled telga in Jules Verne's novel Michael Strogoff.

See also 
 Tarantass

References

Wagons
Animal-powered vehicles
History of transport in Russia